BCDMOS is a complex circuit composed of Bipolar, CMOS and LDMOS devices.

Breakdown voltages can be as high as 750 V.

Features
According to Maxim website, it is an innovative process characteristics that provides the following features:
 high break-down voltage but small transistors,
 quite low on-resistance, which is important for the integration of multiple power FETs of low resistivity,
 double-metal-layer to support hi-current
 combining thin film and poly-poly caps (in silicon). High-accuracy references can be integrated.
According to Dongbu HiTek's news, it claims to launch the first 0.18-micrometre BCDMOS process in industry. The new process integrates logic, analog and hi-voltage functions to reduce size.

References

http://www.dongbuhitek.com/english/semi/pr/press_view.asp?idx=162

Logic families